Cáo Dàyuán (曹大元), born January 26, 1962) is a professional Go player.

Biography 
Cao started learning Go when he was 11. He won the 4th World Amateur Go Championship in 1982 and turned professional in 1985. He was promoted to 9 dan in 1986.

Titles & runners-up 
Ranks #10 in total number of titles in China.

External links
Sensei's Library profile
GoBase.org profile
GoGameWorld profile

1962 births
Living people
Go players from Shanghai